Two Bombs, One Satellite was an early nuclear and space project of the People's Republic of China. Two Bombs refers to the atomic bomb (and later the hydrogen bomb) and the intercontinental ballistic missile (ICBM), while One Satellite refers to the artificial satellite. China tested its first atomic bomb and first hydrogen bomb in 1964 and 1967 respectively, combining the atomic bomb with surface-to-surface missile in 1966, and successfully launched its first satellite (Dong Fang Hong I) in 1970.

History

Proposal and Soviet aid 

In the 1940s and 50s, a group of notable scientists including Qian Weichang, Qian Xuesen, Deng Jiaxian, Peng Huanwu and Qian Sanqiang returned to mainland China.

In January 1955, Mao Zedong expressed the intention of developing atomic bombs during a meeting of the Secretariat of the Chinese Communist Party.

In 1956, hundreds of experts were called by Zhou Enlai, Chen Yi, Li Fuchun and Nie Rongzhen to make plans for China's scientific development, eventually creating an outline of development for the period from 1956 to 1967 (1956-1967年科学技术发展远景规划纲要).

In 1958, Mao formally announced the development of nuclear bombs, missiles and satellite. At the same time, the Soviet Union had provided China with important assistance since 1955, even though on December 10, 1957, the Soviet Union proposed that the United States, the United Kingdom, and the USSR should halt nuclear weapons tests for the next two to three years, to which China supported.

Great Leap Forward and Cultural Revolution 

Since 1958, the research on "Two Bombs, One Satellite" was negatively impacted by the Anti-Rightist Campaign and the Great Leap Forward, which caused the deaths of tens of millions in the Great Chinese Famine. In addition, since the Sino-Soviet split in late 1950s, the Soviet Union gradually ended its assistance to China and recalled all of its experts by 1958. By then, China had created its first experimental nuclear pile with the help of the Soviet Union.

In 1961–62, there was a disagreement among senior officials of the Chinese Communist Party and the Chinese government on whether China should continue with the "Two Bombs, One Satellite" project. Eventually, in November 1962, a central committee led by Zhou Enlai, Nie Rongzhen and others was established, and the project was carried on.

In 1966, Mao launched the Cultural Revolution. Academics and intellectuals were regarded as "Stinking Old Ninth" and were widely persecuted. In 1968, among the leading scientists who worked on the "Two Bombs, One Satellite" program, Yao Tongbin was beaten to death and Zhao Jiuzhang committed suicide, and Guo Yonghuai was killed in a plane crash. By September 1971, more than 4,000 staff members of China's nuclear center in Qinghai were persecuted. More than 310 of them were permanently disabled, over 40 people committed suicide, and five were executed. Many researchers with overseas education background (especially from the United States and the United Kingdom) were regarded as "spies". Only a few scientists including Qian Xuesen were protected in the Revolution because of a special list made by Premier Zhou Enlai (approved by Mao) in August 1966.

Timeline of milestones 
 On October 16, 1964, China's first atomic bomb was successfully detonated in Lop Nur (code-name "Project 596"), making China the fifth country in the world to possess nuclear weapons.
 On October 27, 1966, China's first surface-to-surface missile (Dongfeng-2) carrying nuclear bomb was successfully launched and detonated.
 On June 17, 1967, China's first hydrogen bomb was successfully detonated in Lop Nur (code-name "Test No. 6").
 On September 22, 1969, China's first underground nuclear test was successfully detonated in Lop Nur.
 On April 24, 1970, China's first satellite (Dong Fang Hong I) was successfully launched into space, making China the fifth nation to put a spacecraft into orbit using its own rocket.

Aftermath and memorial 
After the Cultural Revolution, Deng Xiaoping became the new paramount leader of China and started the "Boluan Fanzheng" program. Scientists and intellectuals were rehabilitated and, in particular, Yao Tongbin was honored as a "martyr". Deng emphasized that knowledge and talented people must be respected, and the wrong thought of disrespecting intellectuals must be opposed.

In 1986, four leading scientists who had worked on the "Two Bombs, One Satellite" program proposed to Deng that China must stimulate the development of advanced technologies. Upon Deng's approval, the "863 Program" was launched.

In 1999, twenty-three scientists who had made significant contributions in the "Two Bombs, One Satellite" program were awarded the Two Bombs and One Satellite Merit Award. In 2015, the "Two Bombs, One Satellite Memorial Museum" was opened on the Huairou campus of the University of the Chinese Academy of Sciences.

See also 

 China and weapons of mass destruction
 List of nuclear weapons tests of China
 Chinese space program
 863 Program
 Shenzhou 5
 Chang'e 3
 Tiangong-1

References

Further reading 

 Chinese Nuclear Program. Atomic Heritage Foundation. July 19, 2018.
 Qian Xuesen. Atomic Heritage Foundation.
 Qian Sanqiang. Atomic Heritage Foundation.
 Deng Jiaxian.  China.org.cn.
 Yu Min: The father of China’s hydrogen bomb. Peking University. September 29, 2019.

Military history of the People's Republic of China
Nuclear program of the People's Republic of China
History of science and technology in China
Nuclear history of China
Space program of the People's Republic of China
Persecution of intellectuals